Donald Jacques (May 10, 1934 – December 4, 1983) was an American bobsledder. He competed in the four-man event at the 1956 Winter Olympics.

References

1934 births
1983 deaths
American male bobsledders
Olympic bobsledders of the United States
Bobsledders at the 1956 Winter Olympics
People from Lake Placid, New York